Jose Maria Goulart de Andrade (1881–1936) was a Brazilian engineer, geographer, journalist, poet, columnist, novelist and playwright. He was the son of Manuel Cândido Rocha de Andrade, a naval officer and engineer, and Leopoldina Pimentel Goulart de Andrade. He did his primary and secondary studies in Maceió. At the age of 16, he went to Rio de Janeiro and enrolled in the preparatory course for the Naval Academy, but he intended to become a man of letters. The plethora of talented poets and writers in the capital in the last years of the 19th century inspired Goulart, and soon he left the Naval Academy to enroll in the Polytechnic School. There he obtained the title of engineer in 1906.

He sought and obtained a position in the Federal District City Hall. From an early age, he joined the group of bohemian poets, including Guimarães Passos, Olavo Bilac, Emílio de Menezes, Martins Fontes, etc. As a poet, he excelled in forms such as the vilancete, the rondel, the ballad and the canto real, one of the more complex poetic forms in Portuguese. He published numerous works in the Revista da Academia Brasileira de Letras.

He was the third occupant of Chair 6 of the Academia Brasileira de Letras, to which he was elected on May 22, 1915, in succession to Artur Jaceguai. He was received by Academician Alberto de Oliveira on September 30, 1916. Goulart himself received Xavier Marques into the academy.

He died in Rio de Janeiro on December 19, 1936.

References

https://www.academia.org.br/academicos/goulart-de-andrade/biografia

Brazilian poets
1881 births
1936 deaths